FC Skoruk Tomakivka is a Ukrainian football club from Tomakivka. The club is named after Anatoliy Skoruk. In June 2021, the club was admitted to the Second League.

History 
The club was created in 2000.

Honours 
 Dnipropetrovsk Oblast Championship
 Winner (2): 2019, 2020–21
 Runners-up (1): 2018
 Dnipropetrovsk Oblast Cup
 Winner (1): 2020–21
 Runners-up (2): 2018, 2019

Current squad

Head coaches 
 200? – 2009 Savva Rudych
 2010 – present Oleksandr Stepanov

References

External links 
 Official website.

Association football clubs established in 2000
2000 establishments in Ukraine
Ukrainian First League clubs
Nikopol Raion
Football clubs in Dnipro